Leptarthrus brevirostris  is a Palearctic species of robber fly in the family Asilidae.

References

External links
Geller Grim Robberflies of Germany
Images representing Leptarthrus brevirostris

Asilomorph flies of Europe
Asilidae
Insects described in 1804